This is a list of countries by tin production in 2019 based on Mineral Commodity Summary 2020.

* indicates "Natural resources of COUNTRY or TERRITORY" links.

References 

Lists of countries by mineral production
Tin